The 2011–12 South Pacific cyclone season was one of the least active South Pacific tropical cyclone seasons on record, with only three tropical cyclones occurring during the season. The season ran from November 1, 2011, to April 30, 2012, however, any tropical cyclones that form before June 30, 2012, would have fallen within the 2011–12 tropical cyclone year and would have counted towards the season total. The strongest and only severe tropical cyclone that occurred during the season was Severe Tropical Cyclone Jasmine, which tracked in from out of the South Pacific basin. Within the basin, tropical cyclones are monitored by the Regional Specialized Meteorological Center (RSMC) in Nadi, Fiji, and the Tropical Cyclone Warning Center (TCWC) in Wellington, New Zealand. RSMC Nadi attaches an F designation to tropical disturbances that form in or move into the South Pacific. The United States Joint Typhoon Warning Center (JTWC) issues unofficial warnings within the South Pacific, designating tropical storm-equivalent or greater tropical cyclones with a number and a P suffix. RSMC Nadi and TCWC Wellington both use the Australian Tropical Cyclone Intensity Scale, and measure windspeeds over a period of ten minutes, while the JTWC measures sustained winds over a period of one minute and uses the Saffir–Simpson hurricane scale.



Seasonal forecasts

Ahead of the cyclone season, RSMC Nadi, TCWC Wellington, the Australian Bureau of Meteorology (BoM), the New Zealand National Institute of Water and Atmospheric Research (NIWA) and various other Pacific Meteorological services, all contributed towards the Island Climate Update tropical cyclone outlook that was released in October 2011. The outlook took into account analogue seasons and the La Niña conditions that were developing across the Pacific. The outlook called for a below average number of tropical cyclones for the 2011–12 season, with five to eight named tropical cyclones, to occur between 135°E and 120°W compared to an average of around nine. At least one these cyclones was expected to become either a category 3 or a category 4 severe tropical cyclone, while there was a reduced chance of a Category 5 severe tropical cyclone. In addition to contributing towards the Island Climate Update outlook, RSMC Nadi and the BoM issued their own seasonal forecasts for the South Pacific region.

The BoM issued 2 seasonal forecasts for the South Pacific region between 142.5°E and 120°W, one for the Western Southern Pacific region between 142.5°E and 165°E and one for the Eastern Southern Pacific region between 165°E and 120°W. They noted that the tropical Pacific Ocean was currently experiencing neutral to borderline La Niña conditions which meant that a westward shift in tropical cyclone activity in the basin was favored. As a result, they predicted that the Western South Pacific region was predicted to have 65% chance of being above average, while the Eastern region had a 40% chance of being above average. Within their outlook RSMC Nadi predicted that between five and eight tropical cyclones, would occur within the basin compared to an average of around 9 cyclones. A single tropical cyclone was expected to become or exceed category 3 severe tropical cyclone status.  They also reported that the tropical cyclone genesis trough was expected to be located within the Coral Sea. This was based on the expected and predicted ENSO conditions, and the existence of the Pacific warm pool of sub-surface temperature anomalies in this region.

Risk forecasts
Both the Island Climate Update and RSMC Nadi's tropical cyclone outlooks assessed the risk of a tropical cyclone affecting a certain island or territory. As the tropical cyclone genesis trough of low pressure was expected to be located within the Coral Sea, RSMC Nadi predicted that island nations located to the west of the dateline had an elevated chance of above average activity. There was a reduced chance of above average activity for the areas located to the east of the dateline, however, French Polynesia was thought to have an enhanced chance of a tropical cyclone later in the season.

Seasonal summary

Despite predictions of between 5-8 tropical cyclones occurring within the South Pacific Basin, with only two tropical cyclones developing in the basin, while Jasmine moved in from the Australian region. The first tropical disturbance of the season developed on November 13, to the north-east of Fiji and moved south-eastwards before it weakened into an area of low pressure during November 17, as it affected Fiji.

On February 6, Cyclone Jasmine moved into RSMC Nadi's area of responsibility, and became the first named tropical cyclone since Tropical Cyclone Bune, the previous March, to exist in the South Pacific basin.

Systems

Tropical Disturbance 01F

On November 13, an area of low pressure located within the South Pacific convergence zone started to rapidly develop further. RSMC Nadi then declared the low-pressure area: Tropical Depression 01F later that day, while it was located about 400 km (250 mi) to the north of Suva, Fiji. During the next day, the disturbance moved towards the southwest and onto the main Fijian Islands before convection surrounding the system started to weaken due to land interaction. The disturbance remained over the Fijian Islands until November 16, before RSMC Nadi issued their final advisory on the system as 01F had dissipated. Within Fiji, torrential rainfall was experienced on November 14, over the whole of the Fijian islands, which lead to widespread flooding of low-lying areas, while strong winds prevailed over the Lau and Lomaiviti group of islands during the next day as the rain gradually eased.

Tropical Depression 02F

Early on December 28, RSMC Nadi reported that Tropical Disturbance 02F had developed within an area of moderate windshear, about 140 km (90 mi) to the southeast of Alofi on the island of Niue. During the next day, the disturbance moved towards the east, before it developed into a tropical depression during the next day.

Tropical Disturbance 03F

On January 7, RSMC Nadi started to monitor a tropical disturbance that had developed about 240 km (150 mi), to the southeast of Lifuka, Tonga. Over the next 24 hours the disturbance persisted in a weekly sheered environment to the southeast of an upper-level outflow centre. However late the next day, RSMC Nadi reported that the disturbance was not expected to develop any further and issued their final advisory on the system, since convection had been irregularly surrounding the system during that day.

Tropical Depression 04F

Over the next 24 hours, convection surrounding the system became increasingly displaced to the far east of the exposed low level circulation centre because of strong vertical wind shear. As a result, RSMC Nadi issued their final warning on 04F, late on January 9.

Tropical Disturbance 05F

Late on January 8, RSMC Nadi reported that Tropical Disturbance 05F had developed within a trough of low pressure, about 460 km (285 mi) to the southeast of Apia, Samoa. Over the next few days the disturbance did not develop any further, before RSMC Nadi issued their final advisory on the disturbance during January 10.

Tropical Depression 06F

On January 19, RSMC Nadi reported that Tropical Disturbance 06F, had developed along an active trough of low pressure to the north of Fiji. Over the next couple of days, the disturbance moved towards the south before it developed into a tropical depression and moved across Vanua Levu during January 21. Over the next few days the depression, remained near stationary over central parts of the country and caused widespread heavy rainfall and strong winds, over Fiji's Northern and Eastern divisions which lead to flooding. The depression was last noted on January 25, as it weakened and moved off Fiji and started to move towards the southeast.

Tropical Depression 07F

The RSMC Nadi reported that a tropical disturbance formed near Vanuatu on January 26, and strengthened into a tropical depression on January 29. But on February 1, 07F rapidly became disorganized, and as it began an extratropical transition, the RMSC Nadi issued their last advisory on the storm. On February 2, 07F completed its extratropical transition, and thus it was dropped from the RMSC Nadi's advisories.

Tropical Depression 08F

On January 25, RSMC Nadi reported that a shallow tropical depression, had developed over the northern Lau Islands, within a weak surface trough of low pressure. Over the next couple of days the depression moved southwards through the Lau and Lomaiviti islands and moved into an area of moderate to high vertical windshear. The depression was last noted by RSMC Nadi on January 28, as it moved out of the Fijian archipelago.

Tropical Depression 09F

On January 30, RSMC Nadi reported that a tropical depression had developed about 250 km (150 mi) to the northeast of Port Vila, in Vanuatu. On January 31, RSMC Nadi issued their last advisory on 09F, as the system rapidly became disorganized.

Between February 1 and 4, a convergence zone associated with the remnants of Tropical Depression 09F, affected Fiji and caused widespread rainfall over the islands.

Tropical Depression 10F

On February 2, the RSMC Nadi reported that a tropical depression had formed east of New Caledonia. For the 4 few days, 10F began to accelerate towards the southeast. However, late on February 6, the storm weakened below tropical disturbance intensity, and the RSMC Nadi issued their last advisory on the storm.

Tropical Cyclone Cyril

On February 5, the FMS reported that a tropical disturbance had developed, about 310 km (190 mi) to the southeast of Nadi, Fiji. During that day the disturbance moved towards the northeast and passed through the Fijian islands, while convection surrounding the system increased and organized before it was declared a tropical depression early the next day. Later that day as the system started to move towards the southeast it rapidly consolidated further with the JTWC and the FMS both reporting that the depression had developed into a tropical cyclone, with the later naming it Cyril as it moved south-eastwards through the Tongan islands.

Later that day as the system moved below 25S and out of RSMC Nadi's area of responsibility, Cyril weakened and became a category 1 tropical cyclone. Within the Fijian Islands, Cyril caused heavy rain, high seas, strong and gusty winds, before it brought gale-force winds and torrential rain to Tonga. As a result, some flooding and minor damage to vegetation and plantations was reported in parts of the Vava'u group of islands with fruit bearing trees such as breadfruit and banana trees, severely affected.

Severe Tropical Cyclone Jasmine

Cyclone Jasmine was a long–lived annular tropical cyclone that affected several countries, particularly Vanuatu and Tonga, over a 19‑day span. Cyclone Jasmine developed from an area of disturbed weather on February 1 in the Gulf of Carpentaria. Initially, the storm moved towards the east and across the Cape York Peninsula. As it moved across the South Pacific, earlier existing wind shear conditions lessened, and Jasmine began to strengthen at a faster rate. Steadily intensifying, Erica reached peak intensity on February 8 as a Category 4 equivalent on the Saffir–Simpson hurricane scale, while beginning to show annular characteristics. The next day Jasmine entered an area of vertical wind shear, which consequently weakened the cyclone and caused its eye to expand. A high-pressure area south of Jasmine later steered the weakening cyclone to the northeast on February 12. Although it entered an area of warmer sea surface temperatures, Jasmine subsequently entered extratropical transition and later degenerated into an extratropical cyclone on February 16, before dissipating completely on February 19.

Cyclone Jasmine affected five countries during its existence. The predecessor to Jasmine brought heavy rainfall to areas of extreme northern Queensland. Jasmine also brought rainfall to areas of the Solomon Islands. As a result, pest infestations occurred across the region. In Vanuatu, heavy rains and wind from Jasmine destroy numerous crops. Banana trees in particular are affected by the cyclone. Cyclone Jasmine inundated areas of Tonga that had already been affected by Cyclone Cyril just a week prior. Nukuʻalofa recorded half of its average monthly rainfall in a 24‑hour span due to rains associated with the cyclone. After the season, the name Jasmine was retired.

Tropical Depression 14F

However, during the next day, it was dropped from RSMC Nadi's warnings as it moved south, into TCWC Wellington's area of responsibility. As the depression left RSMC Nadi's area of responsibility, it degenerated into a subtropical depression, before degenerating further into a deep mid-latitude baroclinic low-pressure system during March 18, as it affected New Zealand's North Island. During 14F's time at New Zealand, the storm killed a total of 5 people.

Tropical Depression 17F

On March 25, RSMC Nadi reported that Tropical Disturbance 17F, had developed within a trough of low pressure about 100 km (60 mi) to the northwest of Rotuma. Over the next few days, the depression moved towards the southwest before it moved on to Northern Fiji during March 28. After moving onto Fiji, 17F rapidly developed further which prompted RSMC Nadi to declare the system a tropical depression.

As the storm rapidly developed further, it triggered widespread rainfall and thunderstorms in Fiji, which led to flooding within Fiji. Within the next few days, 17F slowly left Fiji, with 5 people dead, and slowly moved towards the south. On April 1 the Fijian government announced that at least three people have been killed and almost 4,000 forced into evacuation centers after record floods hit the island nation. The next day these numbers rose to at least five dead and more than 8,000 in evacuation shelters. On March 30, 17F left Fiji, and began moving south-southeastward. Within the next day, Tropical Depression 17F turned to the southwest, and later accelerated towards the southeast again, before dissipating late on March 31.

Tropical Cyclone Daphne

On March 31, RSMC Nadi reported that Tropical Depression 19F had developed about 410 km (255 mi), to the south of Honiara on the Solomon Island of Guadalcanal. This low gradually strengthened and on April 2, it strengthened into a tropical cyclone and RSMC Nadi named it Daphne. Daphne moved southeastwards rapidly and moved into TCWC Wellington's area of responsibility late on April 2.

The system was reclassified as extratropical by MetService during April 3, before they issued their last gale warning on Daphne remnants during April 6. Because of the 2012 Tropical cyclone conference the JTWC did not warn on this system and were operating their continuation of operations plan. As a result, the United States Military's Fleet Weather Center in Norfolk, Virginia, designated the system as Tropical Cyclone 18P and issued warnings using data from the FMS and MetService.

Power to the main island of Viti Levu and Nadi International Airport had been cut as thousands of stranded tourists scrambled to leave for home. Despite not affecting Fiji directly squally outer rain bands associated with the system, caused strong winds, torrential rain and flooding over Fiji's western division. As a result, five lives were lost while three people were listed as missing while thousands of tourists were stranded as a result.

Other systems
The following weak tropical disturbances and depressions were also monitored by RSMC Nadi, however all of these systems were either short lived or did not develop significantly.

During that day the depression moved towards the east-southeast, before during the next day it slowly moved towards the west-southwest. The final advisory on Tropical Depression 13F was then issued on February 17, as the depression was moving into the Australian region and was not expected to develop into a tropical cyclone.

During that day, the system moved towards the southeast before it was last noted during the next day as it moved into the subtropics and MetService's area of responsibility. Tropical Disturbance 16F developed along a surface trough of low pressure, to the northwest of Wallis and Futuna, in an area of weak vertical wind shear during March 22. Over the next few days the system moved southwards and did not develop any further before it was last noted during March 26.

During that day the system slightly organised further as it moved south-eastwards, between New Caledonia's Loyalty and Grande Terre islands, before it was declared to be a tropical depression during April 10. The system was subsequently last noted during the next day, as it weakened and moved out of the tropics.

Season effects
This table lists all the storms that developed in the South Pacific to the east of longitude 160°E during the 2011–2012 season. It includes their intensity on the Australian Tropical cyclone intensity scale, duration, name, landfalls, deaths, and damages. All data is taken from RSMC Nadi and/or TCWC Wellington, and all of the damage figures are in 2012 USD.

|-
|  ||  || bgcolor=#| || bgcolor=#| || bgcolor=#|  || Fiji || || None ||
|-
|  ||  || bgcolor=#| || bgcolor=#| || bgcolor=#|  || Niue, Cook Islands || None || None ||
|-
|  ||  || bgcolor=#| || bgcolor=#| || bgcolor=#|  || Tonga || None || None ||
|-
|  ||  || bgcolor=#| || bgcolor=#| || bgcolor=#|  || French Polynesia || None || None ||
|-
|  ||  || bgcolor=#| || bgcolor=#| || bgcolor=#|  || Niue || None || None ||
|-
|  ||  || bgcolor=#| || bgcolor=#| || bgcolor=#|  || Fiji ||  || 8 ||
|-
|  ||  || bgcolor=#| || bgcolor=#| || bgcolor=#|  || Vanuatu, Fiji, New Caledonia || None || None ||
|-
|  ||  || bgcolor=#| || bgcolor=#| || bgcolor=#|  || Fiji || None || None ||
|-
|  ||  || bgcolor=#| || bgcolor=#| || bgcolor=#|  || Vanuatu, Fiji ||  None || None ||
|-
|  ||  || bgcolor=#| || bgcolor=#| || bgcolor=#|  || Vanuatu, New Caledonia, Fiji, Tonga || None || None ||
|-
|  ||  || bgcolor=#| || bgcolor=#| || bgcolor=#|  || Fiji, Tonga || Minor || None ||
|-
|  ||  || bgcolor=#| || bgcolor=#| || bgcolor=#|  || Solomon Islands, VanuatuNew Caledonia, Tonga || None || None ||
|-
|  ||  || bgcolor=#| || bgcolor=#| || bgcolor=#|  || New Caledonia, Vanuatu || None || None ||
|-
|  ||  || bgcolor=#| || bgcolor=#| || bgcolor=#|  || New Zealand ||  || 5 ||
|-
|  ||  || bgcolor=#| || bgcolor=#| || bgcolor=#|  || New Caledonia || None || None ||
|-
|  ||  || bgcolor=#| || bgcolor=#| || bgcolor=#|  || Wallis and Futuna, Fiji || || ||
|-
|  ||  || bgcolor=#| || bgcolor=#| || bgcolor=#|  || Fiji || || ||
|-
|  ||  || bgcolor=#| || bgcolor=#| || bgcolor=#|  || Vanuatu ||  ||  ||
|-
|  ||  || bgcolor=#| || bgcolor=#| || bgcolor=#|  || Vanuatu, Fiji || || 5 ||
|-
|  ||  || bgcolor=#| || bgcolor=#| || bgcolor=#|  || New Caledonia || None || None ||
|-

See also

Tropical cyclones in 2011 and 2012
Atlantic hurricane seasons: 2011, 2012
Pacific hurricane seasons: 2011, 2012
Pacific typhoon seasons: 2011, 2012
North Indian Ocean cyclone seasons: 2011, 2012

Notes

References

External links

 
South Pacific cyclone seasons
Articles which contain graphical timelines
2011 SPac
2012 Spac